Vinyl chloride is an organochloride with the formula H2C=CHCl. It is also called vinyl chloride monomer (VCM) or chloroethene. This colorless compound is an important industrial chemical chiefly used to produce the polymer, poly(vinyl chloride) (PVC). Vinyl chloride monomer is among the top twenty largest petrochemicals (petroleum-derived chemicals) in world production. The United States remains the largest vinyl chloride manufacturing region because of its low-production-cost position in chlorine and ethylene raw materials. China is also a large manufacturer and one of the largest consumers of vinyl chloride. Vinyl chloride is a flammable gas that has a sweet odor and is carcinogenic. It can be formed in the environment when soil organisms break down chlorinated solvents. Vinyl chloride that is released by industries or formed by the breakdown of other chlorinated chemicals can enter the air and drinking water supplies. Vinyl chloride is a common contaminant found near landfills. Before the 1970s, vinyl chloride was used as an aerosol propellant and refrigerant.

Uses 

Vinyl chloride, also called vinyl chloride monomer (VCM), is exclusively used as a precursor to PVC. Due to its hazardous nature, vinyl chloride is not found in other products. Poly(vinyl chloride) (PVC) is very stable, storable and not toxic.

Until 1974, vinyl chloride was used in aerosol spray propellant. Vinyl chloride was briefly used as an inhalational anaesthetic, in a similar vein to ethyl chloride, though its toxicity forced this practice to be abandoned.

Synthesis
Vinyl chloride was first synthesized in 1835 by Justus von Liebig and his student Henri Victor Regnault. They obtained it by treating 1,2-dichloroethane with a solution of potassium hydroxide in ethanol.

In 1912, Fritz Klatte, a German chemist working for Griesheim-Elektron, patented a means to produce vinyl chloride from acetylene and hydrogen chloride using mercuric chloride as a catalyst. This method was widely used during the 1930s and 1940s in the West. It has since been superseded by more economical processes based on ethylene in the United States and Europe. The mercury-based technology is the main production method in China. In view of mercury's toxicity, gold- and platinum-based catalysts have been proposed.

Ethane is readily available, particularly on the U.S. Gulf Coast. Ethylene is made from ethane by cracking ethane and then ethylene is used for production of vinyl chloride. Hence, to save the processing cost for manufacturing ethylene, numerous attempts have been made to convert ethane directly to vinyl chloride. The direct feed of ethane to vinyl chloride plants could thus considerably decrease the raw material costs and make the plants less dependent on cracker capacity. The conversion of ethane to vinyl chloride can be performed by various routes:

High-temperature chlorination:
C2H6 + 2 Cl2 → C2H3Cl + 3 HCl
High-temperature oxychlorination:
C2H6 + HCl + O2 → C2H3Cl + 2 H2O
High-temperature oxidative chlorination:
2 C2H6 +  O2 + Cl2 → 2 C2H3Cl + 3 H2O

A major drawback to the use of ethane are the forcing conditions required for its use, which can be attributed to its lack of molecular functionality. In contrast to ethylene, which easily undergoes chlorine addition, ethane must first be functionalized by substitution reactions, which gives rise to a variety of consecutive and side-chain reactions. The reaction must, therefore, be kinetically controlled in order to obtain a maximal vinyl chloride yield. Vinyl chloride yields average 20–50% per pass. Ethylene, ethyl chloride, and 1,2-dichloroethane are obtained as major byproducts. With special catalysts and at optimized conditions, ethane conversions of greater than 96% have been reported from oxychlorination reactions. The ethylene formed can either be recycled or oxychlorinated and cracked in a conventional manner. Many such ethane-based processes have been and are being developed.

Production 
The vast majority of vinyl chloride is used to make poly(vinyl chloride), PVC. To give a sense of scale, globally approximately 40 million tonnes of PVC resin are produced per year, requiring a corresponding amount of vinyl chloride monomer.

Two methods are employed industrially, the hydrochlorination of acetylene and the dehydrochlorination of ethylene dichloride (1,2-dichloroethane). Numerous attempts have been made to convert ethane directly to vinyl chloride.

Thermal decomposition of dichloroethane
1,2-Dichloroethane, ClCH2CH2Cl (also known as ethylene dichloride, EDC), can be prepared by halogenation of ethane or ethylene, inexpensive starting materials. EDC thermally converts into vinyl chloride and anhydrous HCl. This production method has become the major route to vinyl chloride since the late 1950s.

ClCH2CH2Cl → CH2=CHCl + HCl

The thermal cracking reaction is highly endothermic, and is generally carried out in a fired heater. Even though residence time and temperature are carefully controlled, it produces significant quantities of chlorinated hydrocarbon side products. In practice, the yield for EDC conversion is relatively low (50 to 60 percent). The furnace effluent is immediately quenched with cold EDC to minimize undesirable side reactions. The resulting vapor-liquid mixture then goes to a purification system. Some processes use an absorber-stripper system to separate HCl from the chlorinated hydrocarbons, while other processes use a refrigerated continuous distillation system.

Synthesis from acetylene 
Acetylene reacts with anhydrous hydrogen chloride gas over a mercuric chloride catalyst to give vinyl chloride:
C2H2 + HCl → CH2=CHCl
The reaction is exothermic and highly selective. Product purity and yields are generally very high.

This route to vinyl chloride was common before ethylene became widely distributed. When vinyl chloride producers shifted to using the thermal cracking of EDC described above, some used byproduct HCl in conjunction with a colocated acetylene-based unit. The hazards of storing and shipping acetylene meant that the vinyl chloride facility needed to be located very close to the acetylene generating facility. China still uses this method to produce vinyl chloride due to the large reserves of coal from which acetylene is produced.

Storage and transportation 
Vinyl chloride is stored as a liquid. The accepted upper limit of safety as a health hazard is 500 ppm. Often, the storage containers for the product vinyl chloride are high capacity spheres. The spheres have an inside sphere and an outside sphere. Several inches of space separate the inside sphere from the outside sphere. The interstitial space between the spheres is purged with an inert gas such as nitrogen. As the nitrogen purge gas exits the interstitial space it passes through an analyzer that detects whether any vinyl chloride is leaking from the internal sphere. If vinyl chloride starts to leak from the internal sphere or if a fire is detected on the outside of the sphere then the contents of the sphere are automatically dumped into an emergency underground storage container. Containers used for handling vinyl chloride at atmospheric temperature are always under pressure. Inhibited vinyl chloride may be stored at normal atmospheric conditions in suitable pressure vessels. Uninhibited vinyl chloride may be stored either under refrigeration or at normal atmospheric temperature in the absence of air or sunlight but only for a duration of a few days. If stored for longer periods, regular checks must be made to confirm no polymerization has taken place.

In addition to its toxicity risk, transporting vinyl chloride also presents the same risks as transporting other flammable gases such as propane, butane, or natural gas.

Fire and explosion hazard
In the U.S., OSHA lists vinyl chloride as a Class IA Flammable Liquid, with a National Fire Protection Association Flammability Rating of 4. Because of its low boiling point, liquid vinyl chloride will undergo flash evaporation (i.e., autorefrigerate) upon its release to atmospheric pressure. The portion vaporized will form a dense cloud (more than twice as heavy as the surrounding air). The risk of subsequent explosion or fire is significant. According to OSHA, the flash point of vinyl chloride is −78 °C (−108.4 °F). Its flammable limits in air are: lower 3.6 volume% and upper 33.0 volume%. The explosive limits are: lower 4.0%, upper 22.05% by volume in air. Fire may release toxic hydrogen chloride (HCl) and carbon monoxide (CO) and trace levels of phosgene. Vinyl chloride can polymerise rapidly due to heating and under the influence of air, light and contact with a catalyst, strong oxidisers and metals such as copper and aluminium, with fire or explosion hazard. As a gas mixed with air, vinyl chloride is a fire and explosion hazard. On standing, vinyl chloride can form peroxides, which may then explode. Vinyl chloride will react with iron and steel in the presence of moisture.

Health effects 
Vinyl chloride finds its major application in the production of PVC. Since it is a gas under most ambient conditions, primary exposure is via inhalation, as opposed to the consumption of contaminated food or water, with occupational hazards being highest. Prior to 1974, workers were commonly exposed to 1,000 ppm vinyl chloride, causing "vinyl chloride illness" such as acroosteolysis and Raynaud's Phenomenon. The symptoms of vinyl chloride exposure are classified by ppm levels in ambient air with 4,000 ppm having a threshold effect. The intensity of symptoms varies from acute (1,000–8,000 ppm), including dizziness, nausea, visual disturbances, headache, and ataxia, to chronic (above 12,000 ppm), including narcotic effect, cardiac arrhythmias, and fatal respiratory failure. RADS (Reactive Airway Dysfunction Syndrome) may be caused by acute exposure to vinyl chloride.

Vinyl chloride is a mutagen having clastogenic effects which affect lymphocyte chromosomal structure. Vinyl chloride is a IARC group 1 Carcinogen posing elevated risks of rare angiosarcoma, brain and lung tumors, and malignant haematopoeitic lymphatic tumors. Chronic exposure leads to common forms of respiratory failure (emphysema, pulmonary fibrosis) and focused hepatotoxicity (hepatomegaly, hepatic fibrosis). Continuous exposure can cause CNS depression including euphoria and disorientation. Decreased male libido, miscarriage, and birth defects are known major reproductive defects associated with vinyl chloride.

Vinyl chloride can have acute dermal and ocular effects. Dermal exposure effects are thickening of skin, edema, decreased elasticity, local frostbites, blistering, and irritation. The complete loss of skin elasticity expresses itself in Raynaud’s Phenomenon.

Liver toxicity 
The hepatotoxicity of vinyl chloride has long been established since the 1930s when the PVC industry was just in its early stages. In the very first study about the dangers of vinyl chloride, published by Patty in 1930, it was disclosed that exposure of test animals to just a single short-term high dose of vinyl chloride caused liver damage. In 1949, a Russian publication discussed the finding that vinyl chloride caused liver injury among workers. In 1954, B.F. Goodrich Chemical stated that vinyl chloride caused liver injury upon short-term exposures. Almost nothing was known about its long-term effects. They also recommended long-term animal toxicology studies. The study noted that if a chemical did justify the cost of testing, and its ill-effects on workers and the public were known, the chemical should not be made. In 1963, research paid for in part by Allied Chemical found liver damage in test animals from exposures below 500 parts per million (ppm). Also in 1963, a Romanian researcher published findings of liver disease in vinyl chloride workers. In 1968, Mutchler and Kramer, two Dow researchers, reported their finding that exposures as low as 300 ppm caused liver damage in vinyl chloride workers thus confirming earlier animal data in humans. In a 1969 presentation given in Japan, P. L. Viola, a European researcher working for the European vinyl chloride industry, indicated, "every monomer used in V.C. manufacture is hazardous....various changes were found in bone and liver. Particularly, much more attention should be drawn to liver changes. The findings in rats at the concentration of 4 to 10 ppm are shown in pictures." In light of the finding of liver damage in rats from just 4–10 ppm of vinyl chloride exposure, Viola added that he "should like some precautions to be taken in the manufacturing plants polymerizing vinyl chloride, such as a reduction of the threshold limit value of monomer."
Vinyl chloride was first reported to induce angiosarcoma of the liver in 1974 and further research has demonstrated the carcinogenicity of VC to other organs and at lower concentrations, with evidence now extending to jobs associated with poly(vinyl chloride) exposure, indicating the need for prudent control of PVC dust in the industrial setting.

Vinyl chloride is now an IARC group 1 carcinogen known to cause hepatic angiosarcoma (HAS) in highly exposed industrial workers. Vinyl chloride monomer, a component in the production of poly(vinyl chloride) (PVC) resins, is a halogenated hydrocarbon with acute toxic effects, as well as chronic carcinogenic effects.

Cancerous tumors 
In 1970, Viola reported that test animals exposed to 30,000 ppm of vinyl chloride developed cancerous tumors. Viola began his research looking for the cause of liver and bone injuries found in vinyl chloride workers. Viola's findings in 1970 were a "red flag" to B.F. Goodrich and the industry. In 1972, Maltoni, another Italian researcher for the European vinyl chloride industry, found liver tumors (including angiosarcoma) from vinyl chloride exposures as low as 250 ppm for four hours a day.

In 1997 the U.S. Centers for Disease Control and Prevention (CDC) concluded that the development and acceptance by the PVC industry of a closed loop polymerization process in the late 1970s "almost completely eliminated worker exposures" and that "new cases of hepatic angiosarcoma in vinyl chloride polymerization workers have been virtually eliminated."

The Houston Chronicle claimed in 1998 that the vinyl industry manipulated vinyl chloride studies to avoid liability for worker exposure and hid extensive and severe chemical spills in local communities.

Environment pollution 
According to the U.S. EPA, "vinyl chloride emissions from poly(vinyl chloride) (PVC), ethylene dichloride (EDC), and vinyl chloride monomer (VCM) plants cause or contribute to air pollution that may reasonably be anticipated to result in an increase in mortality or an increase in serious irreversible, or incapacitating reversible illness. Vinyl chloride is a known human carcinogen that causes a rare cancer of the liver." EPA's 2001 updated Toxicological Profile and Summary Health Assessment for vinyl chloride in its Integrated Risk Information System (IRIS) database lowers EPA's previous risk factor estimate by a factor of 20 and concludes that "because of the consistent evidence for liver cancer in all the studies...and the weaker association for other sites, it is concluded that the liver is the most sensitive site, and protection against liver cancer will protect against possible cancer induction in other tissues."

Microbial remediation
The bacteria species Nitrosomonas europaea can degrade a variety of halogenated compounds including trichloroethylene, and vinyl chloride.

See also 
 Vinyl group
 List of refrigerants, for R-1140
 2023 Ohio train derailment, in which a large amount of vinyl chloride was spilled

References

Additional references for environmental pollution
 International Programme on Chemical Safety (IPCS) (1999). Vinyl chloride. Environmental Health Criteria 215. WHO, Geneva.
 National Poisons Information Service (NPIS) (2004). "Vinyl chloride." TOXBASE®.
 World Health Organisation (WHO) (2000). "Air quality guidelines for Europe." WHO Regional Publications, European Series, No. 91. 2nd edition. WHO Regional Office for Europe. Copenhagen.
 Hathaway G.J. and Proctor N.H. (2004). Chemical Hazards of the Workplace. 5th edition. John Wiley & Sons, New Jersey.
 Risk Assessment Information System (RAIS) (1993). "Toxicity summary for vinyl chloride. "Chemical Hazard Evaluation and Communication Group, Biomedical and Environmental Information Analysis Section, Health and Safety Research Division.

Inline citations

Further reading

External links 
 Information on the aerosol propellant controversy
 ATSDR Toxicological Profile for chloroethene / vinyl chloride
 CDC – NIOSH Pocket Guide to Chemical Hazards
 Chemical Identifiers for Vinyl Chloride from CAMEO Chemicals

Chloroalkenes
Hazardous air pollutants
Hepatotoxins
Monomers
IARC Group 1 carcinogens
Commodity chemicals
Vinyl compounds